The Military Cross is a British military decoration for gallantry.

Military Cross may also refer to one of the following awards.

 Military Cross (Belgium), established 1885, awarded by the Belgian Armed Forces
 Military Cross (Poland), established 2007, a Polish decoration for soldiers and civilians

See also
Order of the Military Cross, Polish order established 2006